I Feel Good! is an album by blues musician John Lee Hooker that was recorded in France in 1969 and originally released by the French Carson label before being released in the US on the Jewel label in 1971.

Reception
Bruce Eder

AllMusic reviewer Bruce Eder stated: "Nine songs recorded double-quick in one session, with Lowell Fulson on lead guitar on most of it. The rare embellishment on a Hooker release makes for unusually complex and rewarding listening, instrumentally speaking, beneath Hooker's ominous vocals. The textures here are very crisp and vivid, with a crunchiness that should make this an LP of choice for Hooker's rock fans, much more so than, say, the Canned Heat collaborations ... The uncredited band that shows up on some of these cuts is loose enough to follow Hooker, and he and Fulson play like one person".

Track listing
All compositions credited to John Lee Hooker
 "I Feel Good" – 4:05
 "Baby Baby" – 4:27
 "Dazie Mae" – 4:23
 "Stand By" – 6:20
 "Going Home" – 3:05
 "Looking Back Over My Day" – 4:30
 "Roll and Tumble" – 3:00
 "Baby Don't Do Me Wrong" – 5:00
 "Come On Baby" – 5:07

Personnel
John Lee Hooker – guitar, vocals
Lowell Fulson – guitar
Carey Bell – bass
S.P. Leary – drums

References

John Lee Hooker albums
1971 albums
Jewel Records (Shreveport record label) albums